The SINAG (Tagalog for sun ray), based in De La Salle University in the Philippines, is the first Philippine solar-powered race car and the first entry of the Philippines to the World Solar Challenge.

The solar car was inaugurated on January 27, 2007, at NBC Tent, Fort Bonifacio, Taguig.

Design
The design and construction was undertaken by a group of faculty and students from the Mechanical Engineering Department and the Electronics and Communications Engineering Department of De La Salle University. They also had the help and partnership of Ford Group Philippines, San Miguel Corporation, Motolite, Shell, SunPower, Philippine Airlines and Ventus.

The solar panels used by the Sinag solar–powered car was manufactured by SunPower. The body of the car was made of carbon fibers and with the Philippine colors.

2007 World Solar Challenge
The Philippine team finished 12th place from 40 participants. The team finished the  race from Darwin to Adelaide at 4 p.m. on October 27, 2007 (Australian time).

Sinag performed exceptionally well from the beginning of the race in Darwin on Sunday, October 21. Needing only minor adjustments to its brake system, Sinag quickly zoomed to 11th place. The team  maintained this position and made excellent time, passing the halfway mark at Alice Springs on Wednesday, October 24, and breaching the 2,000 km mark at Cadney Homestead the following day, October 25.

The SINAG solar car arrived at the finish line of the World Solar Challenge (WSC) with over a day to spare. SINAG arrived in Adelaide at around 4pm, well before the 5pm cut-off for the day. SINAG Technical Head Engr. Rene Fernandez proclaimed “The Philippine flag has reached Adelaide!”  as the car crossed the finish line, greeted by a small crowd of Filipino well-wishers carrying small flags of their own.

The all-Filipino Team SINAG was warmly welcomed by the Lord Mayor of Adelaide Michael Harbison and by Hans Tholstrup himself, the founder of the WSC and the first person to cross Australia in a solar car, The Quiet Achiever. Team SINAG also got to meet the members of the Nuon Solar Team from the Delft University of Technology, the multiple successive winners of the WSC.

The Netherlands' Nuon Solar Team, with their car called Nuna4 won the overall championship finishing the race on Oct. 25.

Recognition
In Senate Resolution No. 32, the all-Filipino team of Sinag was congratulated for their exemplary performance in the 2007 World Solar Challenge.

President Gloria Macapagal Arroyo also cited and recognized in Malacañan Palace the team for a job well done.

Team
 Rene Fernandez - Overall Project Leader
 Robert Obiles - Overall Student Team Leader
 Ronafe de Castro - Sinag Team Secretary
Mechanical Team
 Anthony Escolar - Faculty Adviser
 Mico Villena - Student Team Leader
 Prince Asumbrado
 Maybelline Boon
 Neo Broncano
 GJ Campecino
 Hanry Chan
 Johannes Chiong - The Handsome
 Klyde Chua
 Javy Locsin
 Rick Senales
 Sherwin Siahetiong
 Chike Siman
 Raffy Velasco
Electrical Team
 Jose Antonio Catalan - Faculty Adviser
 Emmanuel A. Gonzalez - Faculty Adviser
 Cesar Llorente - Faculty Adviser
 Leo Ambata - Faculty Adviser
 Jingel Tio - Faculty Adviser
 Noriel Mallari - Faculty Adviser
 Kaiser Fernandez - Student Team Leader
 Prince Ang
 Ryan Joseph Bitanga
 Jhoana Guillen E. Bregonia
 Walter Chua
 Harold King M. Dimay
 Lorenzo Miguel A. Javier
 Rainier N. Ong
 Fredric Lance C. Ong
 Frank J. Tua
 Erbert Anton P. Vergara
 Vincent Nonato Yao
Shell Team
 Martin Ernesto Kalaw - Faculty Adviser
 Martin Sy-Quia - Student Team Leader
 Margarita Antonio
 Alfred Cabiling
 Jon Louie Chiu
 Mark de Jesus
 Jade Lu
 John Ng
 Elvin Ngo
 Josue Reyes
 Bryan Sy
 Victor Yu
 Sherwin To
 Lavina Parwani
CAD Team
 Isidro Marfori - Faculty Adviser
 John Ng
 Prince Ang
Drivers
 Ivan Porcalla
 Eric Tan
 Sherwin To
 Robert Obiles
Marketing Team
 Dennis Beng Hui - DLSU IE Department
 Brian Gail Bautista - DLSU Marketing & Communication
 Gian Carlo Vizcarra - DLSU Marketing & COmmunication
 Cherry Ramirez - Ford Group Philippines
 Ernest Estrera - Motolie
 Jess Garcia - Philippine Airlines
 Jemmie Chua - San Miguel Corporation
 Mylene Santos - Pilipinas Shell
 Jong Jimenez - Sunpower
 Isabel Arches - Ventus
 Jovy Astillero - Creasia
 Mark Peckson - JWT
 Donna Conda - Stratworks, Inc.

Sinag Team to Australia
 Rene Fernandez - Team Captain
 Jack Catalan - Deputy Team Captain
 Emmanuel Gonzalez - Safety Officer
 Isidro Marfori - Head of Mechanical
 Noriel Mallari - Head of Electrical
 Eric Tan - Driver
 Ivan Porcalla - Driver
 Sherwin To - Driver
 Robert Obiles - Driver
 Prince Ang - Mechanical
 Mico Villena - Mechanical
 Martin Sy-Quia - Mechanical
 Vincent Yao - Electrical
 Kaiser Fernandez - Electrical
 Walter Chua - Electrical

References

External links
 Sinag:The First Philippine Solar-Powered Car
 De La Salle University - Manila

Solar car racing
Science and technology in the Philippines